Susanne Kathrin Michel (née Bischof; born 17 April 1963) is a German trade unionist and politician of the Social Democratic Party (SPD) who has been a Member of the German Bundestag for Saxony since 2021.

Early career
From 1983 to 2021, Michel worked for BASF in Schwarzheide.

Political career
Since October 2021, Michel has been co-chairing the SPD in Saxonia, alongside Henning Homann.

In the negotiations to form a so-called traffic light coalition of the SPD, the Green Party and the Free Democratic Party (FDP) following the 2021 federal elections, Michel was part of her party's delegation in the working group on climate protection and energy policy, co-chaired by Matthias Miersch, Oliver Krischer and Lukas Köhler.

In parliament, Michel has since been serving on the Budget Committee and its Subcommittee on European Affairs.

Other activities
 IG Bergbau, Chemie, Energie (IG BCE), Member

References 

Living people
1963 births
People from Forst (Lausitz)
21st-century German politicians
21st-century German women politicians
Members of the Bundestag for Saxony
Members of the Bundestag for the Social Democratic Party of Germany
Female members of the Bundestag
Members of the Bundestag 2021–2025
21st-century German engineers
German women engineers
Technical University of Dortmund alumni